Tavë kosi ("soured milk casserole") is a national dish in Albania. It is a dish of lamb (occasionally chicken, then called tavë kosi me mish pule) and rice baked with a mixture of yogurt and eggs (replacing the original soured milk) added to a roux (wheat flour and butter). It is also popular in Greece, North Macedonia, Kosovo and Turkey, where it is known as Elbasan tava ( or Tava e Elbasanit), named after the Albanian city of Elbasan.

See also

 List of lamb dishes

References

Albanian cuisine
Lamb dishes
National dishes